Ramveer Rai (born 1 December 1987) is a cricketer who played for the United Arab Emirates national cricket team, who has played one One Day International and one first class match for the United Arab Emirates cricket team. He has also represented UAE at youth level.

Rai opened the batting in his only One-day International, against Sri Lanka at the 2004 Asia Cup, top-scoring with 39 after over two hours at the crease, and he faced 124 balls, more than anyone else in the match. At the time, he was the youngest player to appear for UAE, and the sixth youngest in an ODI, at 16 years, 229 days. However, after scoring 2 and 1 in an Intercontinental Cup match with Malaysia in September 2004, Rai was dropped from the side, and he has not featured at senior level for UAE again.

References

Emirati cricketers
1987 births
Living people
United Arab Emirates One Day International cricketers
Indian expatriate sportspeople in the United Arab Emirates